The 2017 Asian Athletics Championships was the 22nd edition of the Asian Athletics Championships. It was held from 6 to 9 July 2017 at the Kalinga Stadium in Bhubaneswar, India. Bhubaneswar was the third Indian city to host Asian Championships. Around 560 athletes from 41 countries attended the event.

The Championships were originally scheduled to be held at Ranchi, Jharkhand. After Ranchi's inability to host this event, Bhubaneswar was selected as the venue for this event. On 30 March 2017 post a detailed presentation by Adille Sumariwalla, President AFI, Bhubaneswar was selected for hosting the Asian Athletics Championship by the Asian Athletics Association Council. The previous edition of the championship was held in Wuhan, China from 3–7 June 2015.

The Asian Athletics Championships are organized by Asian Athletics Association every two years. Bhubaneswar is the third Indian-city to host the Asian Athletics Championship with Delhi in 1989 being the first and Pune in the year 2013 to be the second Indian cities.

The winners of the Championships got a direct berth for the 2017 World Championships in London to be held in August. As host, India was eligible to field three athletes in each discipline, instead of the usual two.

Venues and infrastructure

The event took place at Kalinga Stadium in Bhubaneswar, Odisha. The Kalinga Stadium has the sitting capacity of 50,000 spectators. The stadium was renovated with a new synthetic track, with floodlights and a warm-up facility has been set up to host the event. After Ranchi pull-out from hosting the 2017 Asian Athletics Championships, the 86th Asian Athletics Association Council meeting confirmed Bhubaneswar as the host of 22nd Asian Athletics Championships. The Government of Odisha decided to renovate the Kalinga Stadium within 90 days of time to host the event.

Logo and Mascot 

On 8 May 2017, the logo and mascot of Championship were released. Olly, the olive ridley sea turtle, an endangered species that travels to Odisha's Rushikulya and Gahirmatha beaches for its nesting, was chosen as the mascot. It was flagged off by the Chief Minister of Odisha, Naveen Patnaik, at the Championships' mascot rally covering 30 districts of the state of Odisha.

Culture 

Over 500 artists performed during the opening ceremony of the championships on 5 July 2017. Around 400 Odissi dancers performed in an act depicting the Kalinga War and Emperor Kharavela. Shankar Mahadevan with his troupe performed the Rangabati song during the event, with the Sambalpuri dance group.

Media Coverage
Prasar Bharati, through the Doordarshan (DD), is the exclusive Host Broadcaster for the 22nd Asian Athletics Championships. Doordarshan will undertake all the obligations of the Host Broadcaster for the Championships and will provide the basic feed of the event.

Doping
The National Anti-Doping Agency (NADA) found that the athlete Manpreet Kaur, Asian champion woman shot putter tested positive for a banned substance.

Event summary

Men

Track

Athletes with stars competed in the heats but not the finals, and received medals.

Field

Combined

Women

Track

Field

Combined

Medal count
Key

Participating nations 
A total 560 athletes from 41 nations attended the event.

Gallery

References

External links

Asian Athletics Association
22nd Asian Athletics Championships
Results book

 
Asian Athletics Championships
Asian Championships
Athletics
2017 in Asian sport
International athletics competitions hosted by India
Sports competitions in Odisha
Asian Athletics Championships